The following meters were used in Greek poetry and adapted for Latin poetry:

Major forms
Dactylic hexameter, the meter of the Iliad, Odyssey and Aeneid, used for epic and other narrative and didactic poetry
Elegiac couplet, consisting of a line of dactylic hexameter and one of dactylic pentameter, employed by Ovid for all his extant works except the Metamorphoses
Iambic trimeter, the most common meter in the dialogue portions of tragedy and comedy

Aeolics
Glyconic and pherecratean
Asclepiad
Sapphic stanza, so called for Sappho
Alcaic stanza, so called for Alcaeus
Hendecasyllabic verse
Adonean

Other meters
Choliambic, also known as limping iambs or scazon
Ionic
Anacreonteus
Anapestic
Trochaic
Dactylo-epitrite
Dochmiac
Galliambic, a relatively rare form of which Carmen 63 by Catullus is the only complete example from antiquity
Monometer, having a single foot throughout

Arts-related lists
Poetic rhythm
Stanzaic form